The Amersham Meeting house is a Friends meeting house (a Quaker place of worship) on Whielden Road in Amersham, Buckinghamshire. It is listed Grade II* on the National Heritage List for England. The meeting for worship is held on Sundays at 11 am.

The meeting house forms part of an extension to the adjoining cottage, Whielden Cottage,  which was built c. 1600. The cottage was extended in 1689 to serve as a Quaker meeting house for the Quakers who had begun to meet in Amersham from the 1660s. The Amersham Quakers received a letter from the noted early Quaker Isaac Penington in 1667.

It was extended and refronted in red brick in the late 18th century. The meeting room is divided into two by a wooden screen with shutters. A large burial ground is situated to the north and west of the house.

The library of the Amersham Quakers is registered on LibraryThing.

References

External links

History of the Amersham Meeting House

Amersham
1689 establishments in England
17th-century Quaker meeting houses
Grade II* listed buildings in Buckinghamshire
Grade II* listed houses
Grade II* listed religious buildings and structures
Quaker meeting houses in England